Luis Santos Silva is a Paraguayan football midfielder who played for Paraguay in the 1958 FIFA World Cup. He also played for Cerro Porteño.

References

External links
FIFA profile

Possibly living people
Paraguayan footballers
Paraguay international footballers
Association football midfielders
Cerro Porteño players
1958 FIFA World Cup players
Year of birth missing